Thomas Johnson Michie Jr. (June 12, 1931 – August 27, 2019) was an American attorney and politician who served as a member of the Virginia House of Delegates and Virginia Senate. He was defeated for reelection in 1991 by Edgar Robb.

References

External links
 

1931 births
2019 deaths
University of Virginia School of Law alumni
Democratic Party Virginia state senators
20th-century American politicians
Trinity College (Connecticut) alumni
Politicians from Pittsburgh